Postplatyptilia drechseli is a moth of the family Pterophoridae. It is known from Paraguay.

The wingspan is about 15 mm. Adults are on wing in October.

Etymology
The species is named after its collector, Ulf Drechsel, to honor his work in collecting Pterophoridae in Paraguay. Until his collecting, minimal knowledge of the fauna of this country was available.

References

drechseli
Moths described in 2006